The United States Senate Health Subcommittee on Children and Families is one of the three subcommittees within the Senate Committee on Health, Education, Labor and Pensions.

Jurisdiction
The Subcommittee's jurisdiction includes Head Start, the Family Medical Leave Act, child care and child support, and other issues involving children, youth, and families.

Members, 118th Congress

Historical committee rosters
117th Congress

References

External links
Committee on Health, Children & Families Subcommittee page

Health Children and Families